George Hirst (1871–1954) was an English cricketer.

George Hirst may also refer to:
 George Hirst (astronomer) (1846–1915), astronomer in New South Wales who was an official observer of the 1874 transit of Venus
 George Harry Hirst (1879–1933), British politician
 George Littlewood Hirst (1890–1967), Welsh rugby union player
 George Hirst (virologist) (1909–1994), American virologist and science administrator
 George Hirst (footballer) (born 1999)

See also
 George Hurst (disambiguation)